Deewana may refer to:
 Deewana (1952 film), Bollywood movie starring Suraiya and Suresh 
 Diwana (1967 film), Bollywood movie starring Raj Kapoor, Saira Banu and Lalita Pawar
 Deewana (1992 film), Bollywood movie starring Rishi Kapoor, Shahrukh Khan and Divya Bharti
 Deewana (2013 film), a 2013 Bengali film starring Jeet and Srabanti
 Deewana (TV series), a 2016 Pakistan television drama series
 Deewana (album), a 1999 studio album by Indian singer Sonu Nigam

See also 
 Diwana (disambiguation)
 Deewane, 2000 Indian film
 Deewaanapan, 2001 Indian film by Ashu Trikha